Celest Chong is a Singaporean actress, singer and former cover model who is currently based in Canada.

Career
Chong began her acting career as a secretary in Eric Khoo's Stories about Love performing a Turkish inspired belly-dance. She also sang the show's theme song, "Sorry, My Love". Later, she moved on to Channel 5's sitcom, Making Love, in which she played a sultry receptionist named Pamela. She later played the character of a child social worker in the Channel 8 television drama, You Light Up My Life. She sang the theme songs for the new show, which were on Singapore's top music charts for four weeks.

In 2001, Chong signed with Universal Music and launched a solo album Belong to Myself. In December 2002, her second album Celest, was released in Singapore, Taiwan, China, Hong Kong and Malaysia. Chong then left MediaCorp and Singapore for Taiwan to work in the Taiwanese entertainment industry where she released her third album, Snowflakes in 2004. While in Taiwan, she also acted as a reporter in C'est La Vie, starring the Taiwanese actor Lin Youwei. She recorded her fourth album, Little Happiness, in 2006.

In 2007, Chong moved to Guiyang in China to film Acalea Blossoms. Two years later, she again moved back Singapore because of a family emergency.

Chong has appeared on dozens of magazine covers including Her World, Vogue, Elle, Citta Bella and FHM. She has modelled around the world for various print advertisements. She was voted one of the Top 100 most beautiful women in the world by FHM and The Sexiest Woman in Singapore by International Media with her five Ss - Sunshine Sweet, Smile, Sexy & Song. She was also voted No.1 in the Singapore Most Sexy Women's Survey on Citta Bella.

Personal life
Chong left Singapore in 2012 and moved to Canada with her Canadian husband. They had since divorced.

Filmography

Television

Film

Discography 
Chong's former singing career included being the lead singer in the all-female band Jungk, produced by Malcolm McLaren in 1998. She also sang "Voice of an Angel" for McLaren. On National Day she sang "Stand Up for Singapore". She was also the lead singer for a song called "Earth Song" regarding environmental awareness. For the film Stories About Love, she sang the title track "Sorry My Love". For the drama series You Light Up My Life, she sang the theme song "Distance" which was No. 1 on the Yes 933 Pop Charts. Chong was voted No. 1 for Most Captivating Voice on Singapore Press Holdings, Asiaone.com.

After a twelve-year absence from music, Chong released her first English solo single "I Got Him" on 31 August 2018, a heavy reggae-influenced upbeat song written by herself and Omar Martinez. She released a beautiful ballad titled "Masterpiece" on 14 February 2019.

Albums:
 Belong To Myself (2001)
 Celest (2002)
 Snow Flakes (2004)
 Little Happiness (2006)

Singles:
 "Earth Song" (2000)
 "I Got Him" (2018)
 "Masterpiece" (2019)

References

External links

Living people
Singaporean emigrants to Canada
Singaporean actresses
21st-century Singaporean women singers
Singaporean Mandopop singers
Singaporean people of Teochew descent
National University of Singapore alumni
21st-century Singaporean actresses
1974 births